Frictional alopecia is the loss of hair that is caused by rubbing of the hair, follicles, or skin around the follicle. The most typical example of this is the loss of ankle hair among people who wear socks constantly for years. The hair may not grow back even years after the source of friction has ended.

Cause
Hair loss on legs went largely undiagnosed, but is now thought to be quite common. While the overall causes are still being explored, the primary culprit is currently thought to be friction from socks and footwear. There is some debate as to what proportion is caused by friction, and what by androgen deficiency, minor vascular disease, rash of various causes, or thyroid deficiency.

References

Conditions of the skin appendages